Shenzhen Metro Line 5 (formerly branded as Huanzhong line), runs West–East from  to  forming an arc around central Shenzhen. It opened on 22 June 2011. Line 5 is an important east west and orbital line that connected various sub-centers of Shenzhen. This led to Line 5 being heavily used. In 2014, average daily ridership exceeds 500,000 people, with over 1 million passengers using the line on 20 July 2018, setting a new record. Since 2019, Line 5 has surpassed Line 1 as the busiest line in the Shenzhen Metro network. By 2021, the line regularly carries well over 1 million passengers every day and reaching the predicted long term daily passenger volume.

History

Phase 1
In 2004, Line 5 was originally envisioned to be an orbital express commuter railway using an upgraded Pinghu–Nanshan railway. In 2006 the line was redesigned to a subway with more frequent stops but still was an orbital route roughly following the Pingnan railway. In July 2007, the line was approved with an expected budget of 19.2 billion RMB (US$3 billion). Construction of Line 5 started on 21 December 2007 with an additional station, added to the design. On 22 June 2011, Line 5 officially opened between Qianhaiwan and Huangbeiling. The final cost of the first phase was about 20.45 billion RMB (US$3.2 Billion). In initial opening, a fleet of 37 trainsets will be operating on Line 5 serving an expected daily passenger volume of more than 400,000 passengers. In the long-term Line 5 was planned to operate with a fleet of 74 trainsets serving a daily passenger volume of over 1 million passengers.

Phase 2 (southern extension)
On 6 April 2015, a southern extension towards Chiwan station broke ground. The extension was opened on 28 September 2019.

Remaining section of Phase 1
However, with passenger growth subway usage, huge volumes of passengers are transferring westbound between Line 2 and Line 5 at Huangbeiling to reach Line 1 and beyond. By 2021, transfer volumes reached 16,000 passengers per hour during AM peak periods. The environmental assessment of the section was carried out on February 25, 2019, to restart the project and improve capacity in the area. The remaining section of Phase 1 started construction on 13 August 2019. This section is 2.88 km in length with 3 stations and completely parallels Line 2. The extension is expected to be completed in 2025.

Opening timeline

Service routes
  — 
  —  (Working days peak hours only)

Stations

Rolling Stock

References

Shenzhen Metro lines
Railway lines opened in 2011